Pietro De Camilli NAS, AAA&S, NAM is an Italian-American biologist and John Klingenstein Professor of Neuroscience and Cell Biology at Yale University School of Medicine. He is also an Investigator at Howard Hughes Medical Institute. De Camilli completed his M.D. degree from the University of Milan in Italy in 1972. He then went to the United States and did his postdoctoral studies at Yale University with Paul Greengard.

De Camilli is known for contributions that has been to demonstrate the crucial role of protein-lipid interactions and phosphoinositide metabolism in the control of membrane traffic at the synapse.

He has received several awards and honors for his work. He was elected to the European Molecular Biology Organization in 1987. In 2001, he was elected to the National Academy of Sciences and to the American Academy of Arts and Sciences. In 1990 he received the  together with Reinhard Jahn (at this time at the Max Planck Institute of Psychiatry). In 2019 he was awarded the Ernst Jung Gold Medal for Medicine for lifetime achievement.

References

External links 
 Personal lab page of Pietro De Camilli
 HHMI Bio
 PNAS Bio

Year of birth missing (living people)
Living people
21st-century American biologists
University of Milan alumni
Members of the United States National Academy of Sciences
Howard Hughes Medical Investigators
Yale University faculty
Members of the National Academy of Medicine